The name varnish tree may refer to numerous species of tree:

The candlenut, or kukui (Aleurites moluccanus)
The goldenrain tree (Koelreuteria paniculata)
The marking nut tree (Semecarpus anacardium)
The Chinese lacquer tree (Toxicodendron vernicifluum)